Enrique Rocha (January 5, 1940 – November 7, 2021) was a Mexican actor. He made his debut in the film industry in the film Guadalajara en Verano directed by Julio Bracho in the last decade of the Golden Age of Mexican cinema.

Filmography

Television roles

References

External links

1940 births
2021 deaths
Mexican male telenovela actors
21st-century Mexican male actors
Mexican male television actors
20th-century Mexican male actors
Male actors from Guanajuato
People from Silao, Guanajuato